Longitudinal muscle of tongue may refer to:

 Inferior longitudinal muscle of tongue
 Superior longitudinal muscle of tongue